Vice Admiral John Collings Taswell Glossop,  (23 October 1871 – 23 December 1934) was a British Royal Navy officer best known for captaining the Australian cruiser  during the Battle of Cocos in which the German cruiser  was sunk.

Naval career

Passing out of HMS Britannia in 1887, he served for a short time in the Channel Fleet.
Glossop returned to England in 1900 and after two years as an instructor in Britannia.

He was given his first command,  Bramble-class gunboat, in June 1902.
This gunboat had only a short commission in Australian and New Zealand waters before being sold in 1904.
Promoted commander in June 1904, he was appointed Drafting Commander at the Royal Naval Barracks, Chatham. Much of the next two years was spent among the Pacific islands.
From Prometheus, he returned to England and was promoted captain in June 1911. Officially reported by the Australian Naval Representative in London as being "anxious to command a ship of the RAN" and "in entire sympathy with the Australian Navy movement", he was given command of a new light cruiser, the Town class , in June 1913; he had held the RAN rank of captain since March. 

In the First World War, Glossop commanded Sydney during the 9 November 1914 Battle of Cocos, defeating the German light cruiser  in a one-on-one engagement and forcing her to ground herself. Glossop gave a detailed account of the fight to the Australian war correspondent A.B. Paterson in Columbo shortly after the encounter. HMAS Sydney'' sailed for Australia in company with the new flagship, an Indefatigable-class battlecruiser, and received a tumultuous welcome on arrival in Sydney.

On 9 February 1917, he was relieved by Captain JS Dumaresq and sailed for Australia to take up the three-year appointment of Captain-in-Charge of Naval Establishments, Sydney.
The severity of the sentences caused a political uproar, and he was attacked in the federal parliament. He was defended by the acting Navy Minister, but the affair may have contributed to his failure to be appointed Australian Naval Representative in London, a post for which he was recommended by the Naval Board. He reverted to the RN in October 1920, and after a short period as coast guard captain at Queenstown, Ireland, was promoted rear admiral on 20 November 1921 and retired next day. He became a vice admiral on the retired list in 1926.

He was appointed a Companion of the Order of the Bath in the 1915 New Year Honours.

References

External links
John Glossop at Australian Dictionary of Biography

1871 births
1934 deaths
Australian military personnel of World War I
Officiers of the Légion d'honneur
People from Twickenham
Recipients of the Order of the Rising Sun, 3rd class
Royal Australian Navy officers
Royal Navy vice admirals